Sir Humphrey Cornewall, baptised 16 July 1616, buried 7 July 1688, was an English landowner from Herefordshire and Member of Parliament for Leominster from 1661 to 1679. He served in the Royalist army during the First English Civil War, although he later claimed to have done so under compulsion. After the Stuart Restoration, he was appointed Deputy lieutenant of Herefordshire in 1662, and became Mayor of Ludlow in 1686.

Personal details

He was born in 1616, the eldest son of John Cornewall and Mary Barneby, and was baptised at Eye, Herefordshire on 14 July 1616.

Career

During the First English Civil War, he served on the Royalist side under Sir Henry Lingen, though he later claimed to have done so only to defend himself and his neighbours from the depredations of cavalier soldiers. Edward Harley attested that Cornewall was forced to participate in an assault on Stokesay Castle and to sit on a royalist grand jury. For this support of the cause of King Charles, he was fined £222 by the victorious Parliamentarians on 1 July 1647. Successfully pleading poverty, he only actually paid £21 16s of this amount. He was also suspected of complicity with George Booth's rising in 1659.

The Restoration brought about a marked improvement in Cornewall's fortunes. His name was put forward as a potential Knight of the Royal Oak. He served as a Justice of the peace in Herefordshire from 1660 until his death, and commissioner for assessment in that county from 1660 to 1680.  He was elected to represent Leominster in the Cavalier Parliament of 1661. He was a major in the Herefordshire Militia by 1662, in which year he also became Deputy Lieutenant of Herefordshire and a commissioner for loyal and indigent officers. In 1670 he became a member of the Council in the Marches of Wales. He was made a captain in the Admiralty Regiment in 1672, and a commissioner for recusants in 1675. After leaving parliament in 1679, he concentrated his attention on Ludlow, where he had been a freeman since 1676. He was an Alderman from 1685 onwards, and was Mayor from 1686 to 1687.

Private life
He married Theophila Skynner (1622–1718), eldest daughter of William Skynner of Thornton Abbey. The couple had nine children:

 Theophila Cornewall (1644–1731), married on 24 September 1673 Edward Agborough of Ludlow
 Robert Cornewall (1647–1705), soldier and courtier
 Cyriac Cornewall (1652–1718), captain in his cousin Henry Cornewall's Regiment of Foot
 Humphrey Cornewall
 Edward Cornewall, also a captain in Cornewall's Foot
 Wolfran Cornewall (1658–1720), captain in the Royal Navy. His great grandson was Charles Wolfran Cornwall.
 Bridget Cornewall
 A daughter whose name is unknown, who married a Mr Whitney
 Caroline Cornewall, married a Mr Roborow

Humphrey Cornwall died and was buried at Ludlow on 7 July 1688.

References

1616 births
1688 deaths
People from Herefordshire
Mayors of places in Herefordshire
Deputy Lieutenants of Herefordshire
English MPs 1661–1679
Royalist military personnel of the English Civil War